Filby is a surname. Notable people with the surname include:

Eric Filby (1917–2004), English table tennis and lawn tennis player
Ian Filby (born 1954), English football forwarder
William Filby (Roman Catholic priest) (c. 1557 – 1582), Roman Catholic priest and martyr in medieval England
William Filby (Anglican priest) (1933–2009), Anglican priest

See also
 Philby, a surname

Surnames of English origin